Epistrophella is a genus of hoverflies in the subfamily Syrphinae, formerly treated as a subgenus of Epistrophe.

Species
Epistrophella coronata (Rondani, 1857)
Epistrophella emarginata (Say, 1823)
Epistrophella euchromus (Kowarz, 1885)
Epistrophella shibakawae (Matsumura, 1917)

References

Diptera of Europe
Hoverfly genera
Syrphini
Taxa described in 1967